The 2010 Aegon Trophy was a professional tennis tournament played on outdoor grass courts. It was part of the 2010 ATP Challenger Tour. It took place in Nottingham, Great Britain between May 31 and June 6, 2010.

ATP entrants

Seeds

Rankings are as of May 24, 2010.

Other entrants
The following players received wildcards into the singles main draw:
  Joshua Goodall
  Ryan Harrison
  Alexander Slabinsky
  James Ward

The following player received entry with a protected ranking:
  Adrian Mannarino
  Gilles Müller

The following players received entry from the qualifying draw:
  Simon Stadler
  Bernard Tomic
  Alexander Ward
  Marcus Willis

Champions

Singles

 Ričardas Berankis def.  Go Soeda, 6–4, 6–4

Doubles

 Colin Fleming /  Ken Skupski def.  Eric Butorac /  Scott Lipsky, 7–6(3), 6–4

References
Official website
ITF Search 
2010 Draws

Aegon Trophy
2010 in English tennis
Aegon Trophy